
Gmina Ulanów is an urban-rural gmina (administrative district) in Nisko County, Subcarpathian Voivodeship, in south-eastern Poland.

Villages
Apart from the town of Ulanów, Gmina Ulanów contains the villages and settlements of Bieliniec, Bieliny, Borki, Bukowina, Dąbrowica, Dąbrówka, Dyjaki, Glinianka, Huta Deręgowska, Koszary, Kurzyna Mała, Kurzyna Średnia, Kurzyna Wielka, Podbuk, Podosiczyna, Ryczki, Wólka Bielińska and Wólka Tanewska.

Neighbouring gminas
Gmina Ulanów is bordered by the gminas of Harasiuki, Jarocin, Krzeszów, Nisko, Pysznica and Rudnik nad Sanem.

References

Polish official population figures 2006

Ulanow
Nisko County